Ryan Fann is a Paralympic athlete from the United States competing mainly in category T44 sprint events.

Fann finished third place in the 400 meters race at the 2004 Summer Paralympics behind winner, fellow American Danny Andrews, whom he teamed up with as part of the gold medal-winning American 4 × 400 m. He is the T44 world record holder of the now defunct race, the 60-meter dash.

He is a co-founder of Amputee Blade Runners.

References

Paralympic track and field athletes of the United States
Athletes (track and field) at the 2004 Summer Paralympics
Paralympic gold medalists for the United States
Paralympic bronze medalists for the United States
Living people
Medalists at the 2004 Summer Paralympics
Year of birth missing (living people)
Paralympic medalists in athletics (track and field)
American male sprinters
Medalists at the 2007 Parapan American Games
21st-century American people